Chala or Chalá is a surname and a given name. People so named include:

Surname
 Aníbal Chalá (born 1996), Ecuadorian footballer
 Carmen Chalá (born 1976), Ecuadorian judoka and former track and field athlete
 Cléber Chalá (born 1971), Ecuadorian retired footballer
 Diana Chalá (born 1982), Ecuadorian judoka
 Emerson Alejandro Chala (born 1991), Ecuadorian hurdler
 Liliana Chalá (born 1965), Ecuadorian hurdler and sprinter
 Vanessa Chalá (born 1990), Ecuadorian judoka
 Walter Chalá (born 1992), Ecuadorian footballer

Given name
 Chala Beyo (born 1996), Ethiopian long-distance steeplechase runner
 Chala Kelele (born 1966), Ethiopian retired cross-country runner

See also 

 Chalas (surname)
 Calas (surname)